Thakur Jaivir Singh is an Indian politician from Bharatiya Janata Party. He is elected from the Barauli constituency in the Uttar Pradesh Legislative Assembly in 2022. He registered the highest margin win of 92,000 votes among the rural constituencies in the 2022 Uttar Pradesh Legislative Assembly election. Thakur Jaivir Singh was a Cabinet minister in the Uttar Pradesh government in the year 2002 & again between 2007 and 2012 and represented Barauli seat.

His wife Raj Kumari Chauhan was Member Of Parliament in the 15th Lok Sabha from Aligarh (Lok Sabha constituency). His son, Arvind Kumar Singh is the youngest candidate in India Lok Sabha MP 2014, contesting from Aligarh..

Earlier in 2017 he vacated his seat for Yogi Adityanath to become an MLC after Yogi Adityanath was chosen as the Chief Minister of Uttar Pradesh. He was elected again as MLC on 6 May 2018, on a BJP ticket.

Political career

Positions Held

External links
 Official website

References

Living people
Politicians from Aligarh
People from Bulandshahr
Bahujan Samaj Party politicians from Uttar Pradesh
Members of the Uttar Pradesh Legislative Council
Bharatiya Janata Party politicians from Uttar Pradesh
Uttar Pradesh MLAs 2022–2027
1964 births